The Canadian Journal of Neurological Sciences is a bimonthly peer-reviewed medical journal and the official journal of the Canadian Neurological Society, Canadian Neurosurgical Society, Canadian Society of Clinical Neurophysiologists, Canadian Association of Child Neurology, and the Canadian Society of Neuroradiology, which collectively form the Canadian Neurological Sciences Federation. Articles are published in English with abstracts in both English and French. According to the Journal Citation Reports, the journal has a 2020 impact factor of 2.104.

References

External links
 
 Canadian Neurological Sciences Federation

Neurology journals
Publications established in 1974
Bimonthly journals
English-language journals
Cambridge University Press academic journals
Academic journals associated with learned and professional societies of Canada